Jesse James Wood (born 30 October 1976) is an American born British musician. He plays guitar and bass guitar.

Wood is the son of The Rolling Stones musician Ronnie Wood, and Krissy Findlay who died of an accidental overdose in June 2005. He attended King's House School and Ibstock Place School in Roehampton, south-west London.

Wood has previously played with Glyda, The Leah Wood Band, The Ronnie Wood Band, Wills and the Willing, HOGG, and The Black Swan Effect. He joined the band Carbon/Silicon in June 2010. In 2014, Wood joined two friends, John Hogg and Sean Genockey, in the band RedRacer. He joined Reef in April 2014.

Wood is also a model. His work includes a Yohji Yamamoto fragrance campaign and Liam Gallagher's Pretty Green clothing label. In December 2014, Wood was featured in British GQ "My Style" page.

Wood has been married twice. He has two children from his first marriage to Tilly Wood, whom he married in 2003.

Wood began dating TV presenter Fearne Cotton in 2011. On 21 February 2013, Cotton gave birth to a son, Rex Rayne Wood. The couple were engaged in December that year and married on 4 July 2014. In 2015 they announced they were expecting their second baby. On 9 September 2015 it was announced that Cotton had given birth to their daughter, Honey Krissy Wood.

He lives in Richmond.

References

External links
Official Reef Band site

1976 births
Living people
British male models
British rock guitarists
British rock bass guitarists
British male guitarists
American male guitarists
People educated at Ibstock Place School
21st-century British guitarists
21st-century British male musicians
Carbon/Silicon members